Christopher Hodson (died ) was an English bellfounder from London, who was active between 1669 and 1696. He cast several notable sets of bells, including Great Tom of Oxford (which weighs six and a quarter tonnes), and the bells for the Chapel at Merton College, also in Oxford, which are known as the oldest peal of bells in the United Kingdom which were cast by one founder. The bells are also noted for their rather unusual ringing room; a gallery snaking around the inside of the tower.

Two bells cast by Christopher Hodson are on display at St Oswald's Church, Durham.

References

Bell foundries of the United Kingdom
People from London
History of Oxford
18th-century English people